Devyn Nekoda is a Canadian actress and dancer. She has appeared in numerous television series from a young age, and in 2023 appeared in the feature film Scream VI.

Early life
Nekoda was brought up near Brantford, Ontario where she went to school. She studied circus arts, gymnastics, and played soccer. She started dancing at age two in Simcoe, Ontario.

Career
A child actress and dancer, she appeared in Utopia Falls and Backstage. she previously also had a role as Arlene in Canadian spin-off Degrassi: The Next Generation. She had a recurring role as Riley is in the first series of the Netflix show Ginny & Georgia, and in 2022 appeared in the Disney musical comedy film Sneakerella, a 21st century update on the Cinderella story.

Nekoda appears in the 2023 film Scream VI as Anika Kayoko, a student at Blackmore University and Mindy Meeks-Martin’s girlfriend.

Filmography

References

External links

 
Living people
21st-century Canadian actresses
Actresses from Ontario
Date of birth unknown
Canadian child actresses
Canadian female dancers
Canadian television actresses